"Old School" is the eighth episode of the first season of the American television police sitcom series Brooklyn Nine-Nine. It is the 8th overall episode of the series and is written by Gabe Liedman and directed by Beth McCarthy-Miller. It aired on Fox in the United States on November 12, 2013. It was the eighth episode to be broadcast but the ninth episode to be produced.

In this episode, Peralta finally meets an idol from his childhood, Jimmy Brogan (Stacy Keach), a journalist who wrote many books in the 1970s and are the inspirations to Peralta becoming detective. However, Peralta's recklessness ends up affecting the precinct's reputation. Meanwhile, Rosa Diaz (Stephanie Beatriz) works with Charles Boyle (Joe Lo Truglio) and Terry Jeffords (Terry Crews) in order to behave correctly on a testimony. The episode was seen by an estimated 3.26 million household viewers and gained a 1.4/4 ratings share among adults aged 18–49, according to Nielsen Media Research. The episode received mostly positive reviews from critics, who praised Keach's performance as well as Jake's character development.

Plot
The precinct is visited by Jimmy Brogan (Stacy Keach), a former journalist and author of police novels in the 1970s. Detective Jake Peralta (Andy Samberg) is a big fan of the books; they inspired him to become a detective. Currently, Brogan is working on a book that details the evolution of the NYPD since the '70s. However, he fails to show interest in the modern environment and the new route the precinct has taken since.

Sergeant Terry Jeffords (Terry Crews) informs Detectives Charles Boyle (Joe Lo Truglio) and Rosa Diaz (Stephanie Beatriz) that Diaz will need to go to court in order testify in a case, but he thinks she needs better manners for the witness stand. They try to change her demeanor to make her a less abrasive presence in court but are unsuccessful. Boyle tries another tactic: he teaches Diaz to envision her "happy place" so she isn't so harsh on the stand. This works, and the accused is sentenced to jail. Diaz thanks Boyle by treating him to dinner with her and her boyfriend.

Peralta and Brogan get drunk and bond in a bar. The next day, Peralta discovers that Brogan has plans to use information from their conversation in his article, including criticism of Captain Holt (Andre Braugher) that may damage the captain's reputation. Peralta convinces Brogan not to publish the offending remarks, but when Brogan gets casually homophobic in conversation, Peralta punches him in the face and Brogan publishes the article with everything in it. Holt is furious when he learns of this and suspends Peralta, but Det. Amy Santiago (Melissa Fumero) tells him the truth—that Peralta had been defending the captain's sexuality. An understanding Holt then condemns the article.

Reception

Viewers
In its original American broadcast, "Old School" was seen by an estimated 3.26 million household viewers and gained a 1.4/4 ratings share among adults aged 18–49, according to Nielsen Media Research. This was a 16% decrease in viewership from the previous episode, which was watched by 3.84 million viewers with a 1.6/4 in the 18-49 demographics. This means that 1.4 percent of all households with televisions watched the episode, while 4 percent of all households watching television at that time watched it. With these ratings, Brooklyn Nine-Nine was the second most watched show on FOX for the night, beating Dads and The Mindy Project but behind New Girl, fourth on its timeslot and tenth for the night in the 18-49 demographics, behind New Girl, The Goldbergs, The Biggest Loser, Person of Interest, Agents of S.H.I.E.L.D., Chicago Fire, NCIS: Los Angeles, NCIS, and The Voice.

Critical reviews
"Old School" received mostly positive reviews from critics. Roth Cornet of IGN gave the episode a "great" 8.3 out of 10 and wrote, "Brooklyn Nine-Nine delivered one of its tightest episodes yet with 'Old School'. The group dynamic is really gelling, which has created some room for the writers to introduce new aspects of the characters' personalities and play with the relationships. The A and B storylines were equally entertaining and pretty much everyone – even Hitchcock and Scully – were given something to do. With the exception of Linetti of course, who wasn't in this episode, sadly. Stacy Keach made for an ideal foil and was entirely believable as an 'old-guard' beat reporter. The tone was mostly salty, with just the right amount of sweet – what with Peralta defending Holt's honor and appreciating Santiago's abnormally warm butt. He's got a soft side after all. More importantly, like Santiago, I think we’re all really starting to be able to read Holt. His little half smile spoke volumes"

Molly Eichel of The A.V. Club gave the episode an "A−" grade and wrote, "'Old School' wasn't just funny in the big, broad moments, but in the smaller ones too. The facial reactions in this episode were exemplary, especially from Andre Braugher and Melissa Fumero. The former didn't play a large part in the episode, but he did what he could in the subtle moments when the viewer is supposed to be paying attention to the joke. The camera work in this episode was also particularly fun, especially in the beginning: the close-up of Boyle in full on bomb squad gear as he, looking absolutely terrified, tries to take Scully's shoes, or the quick pan from Peralta to Santiago after Boyle comments on Peralta's quick virginity loss story. It’s sign of great maturation of the series, and I hope it continues on this path."

Alan Sepinwall of HitFix wrote, "Couple that with a B-story about Terry and Charles coaching Rosa about her courtroom demeanor that used all three characters well (and continued the Schur/Goor trend from 'Parks and Rec' of funny montages of people trying on strange outfits) and didn’t overstay its welcome, and you’ve got another promising outing for the rookie comedy." Aaron Channon of Paste gave the episode an 8.8 out of 10 and wrote, "All of this was wrapped inside an episode that included great hangover humor ('Ughhh, my whole body has drymouth'), advancement of the Rosa-Charles dynamic, which could warrant another recap by itself, tiny nuggets of inside-joke goodness and a not-unsubtle Die Hard reference (again highlighting the writers' supreme understanding of the genre). It was Brooklyn Nine-Nines best episode yet and the one that elevates it from an enjoyable new fall sitcom to must-watch TV (as much as any network television show can invoke such an imperative)."

References

External links

2013 American television episodes
Brooklyn Nine-Nine (season 1) episodes
Television shows directed by Beth McCarthy-Miller